Venus and Mars is a 2001 comedy directed by Harry Mastrogeorge featuring Lynn Redgrave, Daniela Amavia, and Ryan Hurst.

Cast 
 Daniela Amavia as Kay Vogel
 Lynn Redgrave as Emily Vogel
 Ryan Hurst as Roberto
 Fay Masterson as Celeste
 Julia Sawalha as Marie
 Julie Bowen as Lisa Kelly
 Michael Weatherly as Cody
 Hella von Sinnen as Bertha

References

External links

2001 films
German comedy films
2001 comedy films
Films produced by Nelson Woss
Films scored by Nathan Barr
2000s German films
English-language German films